The Fifth Avenue Coach Company was a bus operator in Manhattan,  The Bronx, Queens, and Westchester County, New York, providing public transit between 1896 and 1954 after which services were taken over by the New York City Omnibus Corporation. It succeeded the Fifth Avenue Transportation Company.

History

The company was founded in 1896 when it succeeded the bankrupt Fifth Avenue Transportation Company. It initially operated existing horse-and-omnibus transit along Fifth Avenue, with a route running from 89th Street to Bleecker Street. Fifth Avenue is the only avenue in Manhattan never to see streetcar service due to the opposition of residents to the installation of railway track for streetcars. The company introduced electric buses two years later and was acquired by the newly formed New York Transportation Company in 1899.

They introduced a fleet of 15 of their own motorbuses in 1907 that operated along Fifth Avenue and on some crosstown routes. The company became independent of the New York Transportation Company in 1912.

In 1925, the year that they came under control of The Omnibus Corporation, the company purchased a majority share in the New York Railways Corporation.

When the New York Railways Corporation started converting streetcar lines to buses in 1935–36, the new replacement bus services were operated by the New York City Omnibus Corporation, which had been formed in 1926 and had shared management with The Omnibus Corporation. New York Railways Corporation was dissolved in 1936.

The New York and Harlem Railroad trolleys were replaced by Madison Avenue Coach Company, Inc. buses, and the Eighth and Ninth Avenue Railway trolleys by Eighth Avenue Coach Corporation buses, both companies owned by Fifth Avenue Coach. (Fourth and Madison Avenues; 86th Street Crosstown was not replaced with buses).  Madison Avenue Coach and Eighth Avenue Coach were folded into New York City Omnibus in November 1951.

In 1954 The Omnibus Corporation sold the Fifth Avenue Coach Company to the New York City Omnibus Corporation which changed its name to Fifth Avenue Coach Lines two years later. In 1956, the company also acquired the Westchester Street Transportation Company, a bus company previously affiliated with the Third Avenue Railway. The same year, they also acquired the Surface Transportation Corporation, and allowed it to operate under a new name as a subsidiary of Fifth Avenue. After a strike in 1962, and a fight for control with financier Harry Weinberg, bus operations were taken over by the city. Buses in Westchester survived the strike and city takeover until they were acquired by Liberty Lines Transit in 1969.

Routes
The routes that were operated by the Fifth Avenue Coach Company are listed below.

See also
Manhattan and Bronx Surface Transit Operating Authority, successor to FACCST within New York City
Liberty Lines Transit, Inc., successor to the FACCST routes in Westchester County

References

External links 
 Fifth Avenue Transportation Company, 1885-1895; Fifth Avenue Coach Company, 1895-1962, New York, New York
 The Fifth Avenue Coach Company Collection at the New-York Historical Society

1896 establishments in New York City
1962 disestablishments in New York (state)
American companies established in 1896
American companies disestablished in 1962
Transport companies established in 1896
Transport companies disestablished in 1962
1899 mergers and acquisitions
1925 mergers and acquisitions
1954 mergers and acquisitions
Fifth Avenue
Surface transportation in Greater New York
Bus transportation in New York City
Defunct companies based in New York City
Defunct public transport operators in the United States